Seat Sandal is a fell in the English Lake District, situated four kilometres (2½ miles) north of the village of Grasmere from where it is very well seen. Nevertheless, it tends to be overshadowed by its more illustrious neighbours in the Eastern Fells, Helvellyn and Fairfield.

Name

The unusual name comes from the Old Norse language,  " Sandulfr "  being an Old Norse personal name.

The name element  ' Seat '  is from Old Norse  ' sæter ' .

Toponym

 Sandulfr's sæter
 Sandal's high summer pasture.  

Examples of place names with a similar etymology might include :

 Seatoller , Borrowdale, Lake District : (Seat..oller )  " Óláfr’s sæter " 
 Seatallan , Wasdale, Lake District : (Seat..allan )  " Aleyn's sæter " 

The remains of structures have been found on  Seat Sandal  that are assumed to have been summer shielings (high altitude dwellings ) where people stayed during the summer months in order to watch over the animals.

Both  Seat Sandal  and Seatoller (Seat..oller ) are positioned on historic routes that traverse across the heart of the Lake District, 
suggesting that these were important strategic places.

Topography

The fell's western flanks above Dunmail Raise are grassy and smooth while its eastern slopes are steep and craggy as they fall away towards Grisedale Hause which at  contains Lakeland's highest substantial tarn, Grisedale Tarn. However, this must be regarded as a borderline case as there is no Ordnance Survey surveyed height for the top of Grisedale Hause. Alfred Wainwright gives it a height of  giving Seat Sandal a topographic prominence of only 148 metres (two metres short of Marilyn qualification).

Seat Sandal is distinctive in that its drainage reaches the sea at more widely spread points than any other Lakeland Fell, with Raise Beck going through Thirlmere and Derwent Water to reach the Irish Sea at Workington, Tongue Beck going through the lakes of Grasmere and Windermere to reach Morecambe Bay and Grisedale Beck draining into Ullswater and then to the sea at the Solway Firth. However, this is true only as a result of the diversion of Raise Beck north to feed Thirlmere Reservoir — before this (and still today when there is enough water in Raise Beck for it to flow both north and south), Dollywaggon Pike shared in this distinction — Birkside Gill feeding Thirlmere, Raise Beck feeding Grasmere, and Grisedale Beck feeding Ullswater. The fell's main topographic attraction is Gavel Crag on its eastern side, which is connected to the main body of the fell by a fine rock arête.

Dunmail Raise provides the topographical connection between the Eastern and Central Fells, Steel Fell rising on the other side of the pass.

Geology
A hill of andesite lava forms the summit, the rocks beneath being the dacitic lapilli-tuffs of the Lincomb Tarns Formation.

Ascents
The fell can be ascended from Grasmere or Dunmail Raise although a start from Patterdale is quite feasible. The Grasmere or Patterdale starts use the old packhorse route that links the two places; this is now part of Wainwright's Coast to Coast Walk. When Grisedale Hause is reached it is a steep climb to the summit following a broken wall. There is also a direct ascent up the western slopes starting at Mill Bridge.

Summit
The view from the top is limited by the nearby Helvellyn and Fairfield ranges although there is a good view of Lakeland to the west; the Solway Firth and Criffel are seen on a good day as is Morecambe Bay to the south.

References

Notes

Citations

Sources

Maps

Books

 A Pictorial Guide to the Lakeland Fells, Eastern Fells, Alfred Wainwright,  
 Complete Lakeland Fells, Bill Birkett, 
 The Mountains of England and Wales, John and Anne Nuttall 

Marilyns of England
Hewitts of England
Fells of the Lake District
Nuttalls